Jeanna Louise Oterdahl (9 August 1879, in Uddevalla, Sweden – 25 July 1965) was a Swedish educator, author and poet.

She was educated at the Högre lärarinneseminariet in Stockholm.

References
 Jeanna Oterdahl. Liv och verk. Toijer-Nilsson, Ying, Rabén & Sjögren, 1996.
 Att bryta egen väg. Jeanna Oterdahl i föredrag och författarskap. Stolt, Gunvor, diss. Litteraturvetenskapliga inst. Uppsala universitet, 2002.
 Hon var resande i bildning. Artikel i SvD 16 April 2002, Toijer-Nilsson, Ying.

Further reading 
 

1879 births
1965 deaths
People from Uddevalla Municipality
Swedish educators

Swedish women poets
Swedish women writers